Elom Adablah (born 28 June 1989), better known by his stage name E.L, is a Ghanaian Afrobeats musician, rapper, singer and producer.

E.L's singles include "Obuu Mo", "Kaalu", "One Ghana", "Auntie Martha", "Shelele", "Mi Naa Bo Po", "Koko" and "KaaBuAme", "See me Sometime", "Abaa" and "Pay Like a Boss". His debut album was Something Else (2012). E.L released a mixtape he calls The BAR (Best African Rapper) and in 2017, he released the fourth one called BAR IV.

He won Artiste of the Year and Hip-life/Hip-hop Artiste of the Year at the 2015/2016 Vodafone Ghana Music Awards.

Early life
E.L grew up in Dansoman, a suburb of Accra. He first attended St. Martin De Porres School in Dansoman and later transferred to Jack and Jill where he completed his Junior Secondary School level. He then gained admission into Presbyterian Boys Secondary School (PRESEC), where he discovered music. After high school, he pursued a degree in economics and political science at the University of Ghana, Legon.

Music career

2008: Music beginnings
During his first year in the university, EL signed to Jayso's Skillions Records and helped Jayso co-produce the Skillionaires Demotape. However, after graduating from university, the Skillions broke up and EL became a solo artist. He acquired a studio in Asylum Down and began working on a new mixtape. He went as far as releasing a single, "Chale (So Fli)", with Jay Foley, Wolf and Kwaku T (remix). However, the mixtape was never released. EL relocated to a better studio at Osu, and invested all his available funds in acquiring equipment.

2009–2012: Something Else
EL got signed to BBnZ live His debut double album, Something Else, was released on 1 June 2012 by Akwaaba Music, and is a blend of different varieties of music inspired from various sources.

2014: B.A.R Mix Tape
EL released The Best African Rapper album, shortened as The B.A.R on 20 May 2014. It featured Ayigbe Edem, Sarkodie, Joey B, C-Real, Gemini, Telvin, Frozen, Lil Shaker, Stargo, P. K. and Dex Kwasi.

2015: B.A.R 2
EL announced he was working on B.A.R 2, releasing the cover art and later releasing three songs "All Black", "State of the Nation" and "King Without A Crown". On 29 August 2015, he followed up with the B.A.R 2 concert featuring Wanlov, Ko-Jo Cue, DJ Mic Smith and more.

2016: Elom

EL released his second studio album entitled Elom (Everybody loves original music). The album included singles "Mi Naa Bo Po", "Watch The Way You Dey Waka" and "Nkrumah Pt. 2" featuring Obrafour.

On 15 April 2016 Lauryn Hill headlined a concert dubbed Ms. Lauryn Hill Presents Diaspora Calling! in association with Tidal at Kings Theater, the concert was intended to celebrate the rich tapestry of artists from African Diaspora and included E.L and Stonebwoy from Ghana, also Wondaboy and Mr. Eazi from Nigeria.

2017: B.A.R 4 
The success of the previous installment of the BAR franchise saw the birth of another mixtape. This featured both establishment rappers and also included rising rappers as Teephlow, Kojo-Cue, Medikal. one notable track on the album is Nina, which is storyline song about a psychopathic groupie. Other hard core raps songs as Change, Superstar and Lalafalama were also lauded; as was Bars.

2018: BAR V 
E.L released his fifth studio album titled BAR V (stylised as BVR), a 15 track album. It included rap singles like "Nobody", The Greatest and "Thinkin'." E.L featured Nigerian artiste, Falz, and Ghanaian acts Akan and Bryan The Mensah.

2019: The Linkop - EL & AI 
This was a joint album with another Ghanaian musician, Ayisi - AI. This will be the first time EL released a joint album. Nonetheless, it will mark the second notable joint album from Ghana as Sarkodie (rapper) and Jayso had same with TMG collaboration.
The Linkop album came to bear after the excellent chemistry generated in their collaboration on the Adwuma song. This album has seven track ranging from Afrobeats to Dancehall to Reggae fusion. One track that seems to appeal to masses is the For 2 song.

2020: Songs For Girls 3 EP 
This featured seven songs of different genres. The award-winning rapper took New decade in a whole different mode.

2020: Leaks1 
The beginning of a new decade saw EL drop a series of projects – few singles and two different tapes. First of which was the Leaks1. This featured talented rappers even as they were not well known. One of such rappers is Yung Pabi whom he featured on the song titled Respect. This album had three songs.

2020: Leaks2 
Just as the previous tape before this, it had three tracks. Interesting tracks as they are, some industry pundits/critics labelled as masterpieces. Most prominent track was Track 3 - J.J. Rawlings which featured friend and frequent collaborator Gemini Orleans.

Notable productions
EL has produced songs for many hip hop, hiplife and R&B performers, such as:
Sarkodie ("You Go Kill Me", "Dangerous") in collaboration with krynk man
Keche ("Sokode") in collaboration with krynk man
D-Black ("Get On the Dancefloor")
D-Black ft D Cryme("Change your life")
Donaeo Ft E.L ("Life Saver")
T Blaze ("Aso wo ha")
C-Real ft E.L ("Weytin De Happen") (sexy mama)
C-Real ft E.L ("Do the Azonto")
Lighter ft Promzy of VIP and E.L ("Fear of my Life")
Scientific ft Sarkodie and E.L ("I Like You Girl") 
 J Town ft D Cyrme and E.L ("Party Alhaji")
Sala ft E.L ("Only You")
 Samini ("Too Bad")
Edem ("Wey tin")
Efya ft E.L ("Heartbeat")
Efya ft Mugeez ("Ooh Ooh Ooh")
Reggie Rockstone ("Rockstone's Office"), Asem ("Check Your Weight"), Geelex ("Bend Your Body") and many more.
Joey B ft E.L ("Wow").
 E.L Ft. DopeNation – Ayeyi (Prod. By PeeOnTheBeatz)
 E.L – Vim Yaazo (Prod. by E.L)
 E.L – Joy (Prod. by Kuzie x E.L)

Discography

 Studio Albums
 Something Else (2012)
 ELOM (2016)
 B.A.R. 3: The Lomi Era (2016)
 B.A.R 4 (2017)
 BVR (2018)

 Mixtapes
 Project Hip Hop (with C-Real) (2011)
 Songs for Girls-the Valentines Day Mixtape (2012)
 The B.A.R. (2014)
 Project Hip Hop 2 (with C-Real) (2015)
 B.A.R. 2 (2015)
B.A.R. 3 (2016)
Songs for Girls Vol. 1
Songs for Girls Vol. 2
 Others
Another Rainy Day
Empty Barrels
Find A Way
Getting it Fast
Move On
My Addiction
Pick up
Don Dada ft [Ayigbe Edem] and Telvin

Singles
One Ghana- August 2011
Obuu Mo-  September 2011
Ma Me Wassop- December 2011
Turn the Lights Down- December 2011
Lifesaver ft Donaeo- January 2012
The Botos Song ft (N-Dex & J-Town)- February 2012
Nigg*s in Accra (Azonto RMX) ft C-Real & Stargo- April 2012
The ChO.sen ft (Manifest, D-Black & Sarkodie)- October 2012
Hallelujah ft (M.anifest)- December 2012
No Size- December 2013
See Me Suffer ft (Shaker)- October 2013
Ayayaa- March 2014
My Friend- April 2014
Boorle- September 2014
Sister Araba- December 2014
Agbadza- December 2014
State of the Nation Address- March 2015
Shelele- March 2015
Egbefia- April 2015
Mi Naa Bo Po- August 2015
Koko- November 2015
Pour Put Inside- December 2015
Fire Cant Cool- May 2016
Portray Dey Be- December 2015
Kaa Bu Ame- June 2016
Lalafalama- September 2016
Fefeefe- November 2017
Agbo- February 2017
Eliens Anthem- March 2017
Explain-March 2017
Pay like a Boss-September 2017
Overdose-October 2017
Joy-February 2018
Wosa ft Joey B-June 2018 (Produced by Pee GH)
FWY-May 2018
Efa Wo Ho Ben-December-2-2019
Baba Dey 2021

Videography

Awards and nominations

2010 Africa Movie Academy Awards:Best Original Soundtrack 'A sting in a tale'
2010 Ghana Movie Awards: Best Score Award, Checkmate And more
2011 Ghana Music Awards: Hip-hop Song of the Year award, "Get On the Dance Floor", Producer
2012/2013 Ghana Music Awards Album of the Year
2015/2016 Vodafone Ghana Music Awards Hip-life/Hip-hop Artiste of the year
2015/2016 Vodafone Ghana Music Awards Artiste of the Year
2016 Ghana Music Awards UK Artiste of the Year
2015/2016 Ghana Music Awards Producer Of the Year
2015/2016 Ghana Music Awards Afro pop song Of the Year
2016/2017 Ghana Music Awards  Afro Pop Song Of The Year (Kaa Bu Ame)
2017 Ghana Entertainment Awards - USA Best Album (BAR 3)
2017 4SYTE MVA BEST EDITED VIDEO

Video awards

2013 MTN 4Syte TV Music Video Awards: Best Photography
2014 MTN 4Syte TV Music Video Awards: Best Storyline
2015 MTN 4Syte TV Music Video Awards: Best Edited Video and Best special effect
2015/2016 Vodafone Ghana Music Awards Music Video of the Year(Shelele)

Nominations
2012 Ghana Music Awards: Best New Artist, Best Rapper, Best Collaboration ("You Go Kill Me" with Sarkodie)
2012 Channel O Music Video Awards: Best Newcomer ("Turn The Lights Down")
MTV Africa Music Awards 2016 – Listener's Choice

References

1983 births
Living people
21st-century Ghanaian musicians
Musicians from Accra
Ghanaian Afrobeat musicians
Ghanaian record producers
Ghanaian rappers
Presbyterian Boys' Senior High School alumni
University of Ghana alumni